Raymond Fullam (born 1947) is an Irish lawyer who has served as a judge of the High Court and the Circuit Court. He practiced as a barrister before his appointment to the Circuit Court in 2007 and subsequent appointment to the High Court in 2014. He retired in 2017.

Early life 
Fullam was born in 1947 and is from Tralee. He studied at University College Dublin, obtaining degrees in arts and commerce.

He was called to the Bar in 1977 and became a senior counsel in 1995. He practiced on the eastern and Dublin circuits. He was prosecutor for County Kildare between 1983 and 1991. Fullam also qualified as a chartered accountant.

He appeared in cases involving tax law, personal injuries and judicial review.

In addition to his practice, he was a lecturer at the King's Inns in revenue law was a member of the GAA Drugs Appeal Board.

Judicial career

Circuit Court 
Fullam was appointed to the Circuit Court in October 2007. He was not assigned to a particular circuit. He heard some cases in Tralee, Donegal and Wicklow.

He presided over criminal cases involving sexual assault, forgery, dangerous driving, health and safety law offences, drugs offences, assault and fraud.

High Court 
He was elevated to the High Court in October 2014. His appointment arose out of vacancies created by the establishment of the Court of Appeal.

He was the judge in cases involving child law, personal injuries, the proceeds of crime, bankruptcy and judicial review. Fullam heard aspects of the legal case taken by Rory McIlroy against Horizon Sports Management, his former management team.

He retired in March 2017.

References

Living people
1947 births
People from Tralee
Circuit Court (Ireland) judges
High Court judges (Ireland)
Alumni of University College Dublin
Alumni of King's Inns
21st-century Irish judges